MES Asmabi College, is a general degree college located in P. Vemballur, in Kodungallur,  Thrissur district, Kerala. It was established in the year 1968. The college is affiliated with Calicut University. This college offers different courses in arts, commerce and science.

Departments

Science
Physics
Chemistry
Mathematics
Botany
Biochemistry
Statistics
Zoology
Aquaculture

Arts and Commerce
Malayalam
English
Arbic
Hindi
History
Political Science
Economics
Physical Education
Commerce

Accreditation
The college is  recognized by the University Grants Commission (UGC).

Notable alumni
 E. T. Taison, Member of Kerala Legislative Assembly

References

External links
 http://mesasmabicollege.org

Universities and colleges in Thrissur district
Educational institutions established in 1968
1968 establishments in Kerala
Arts and Science colleges in Kerala
Colleges affiliated with the University of Calicut